Philipp Tischendorf (born 7 June 1988) is a German former competitive figure skater. He is the 2007 German national silver medalist and competed at two ISU Championships.

Personal life
Philipp Tischendorf was born on 7 June 1988 in Berlin, Germany. In 1994, he began attending the Werner-Seelenbinder-School in Berlin, a special school for sportsmen. His mother was a gymnast, his father played volleyball in the second highest league in East Germany, his brother Robert played football for BFC Dynamo Berlin, and his sister Nadine and brother Max practiced figure skating.

Career
Tischendorf was introduced to figure skating at age three and a half by his sister Nadine, who is 11 years his elder. Early in his career, he was coached by Jürgen Bertko. He debuted on the ISU Junior Grand Prix series in 2004.

In the 2006–07 season, Tischendorf won silver on the senior level at the German Championships and was selected to represent Germany at the 2007 European Championships in Warsaw. He qualified for the free skate by placing 16th in the short program. After placing 14th in the free, he finished 15th overall. At the 2007 World Junior Championships in Oberstdorf, he placed 20th in the short program, 11th in the free skate, and 13th overall. He was coached by Olympic silver medalist Romy Österreich in Berlin.

Tischendorf was injured in March 2007 while practicing a quadruple Lutz, forcing him to sit out the 2007–08. In February 2009, he relocated from Berlin to Oberstdorf to be coached by Michael Huth.

Tischendorf served in the Bundeswehr as a sportsperson.

Programs

Competitive highlights
JGP: Junior Grand Prix

References

External links 

 
 Official website of Philipp Tischendorf

German male single skaters
Living people
1988 births
Figure skaters from Berlin
20th-century German people
21st-century German people